Dallas South Port Airport  is a privately owned public airport in Ferris, Ellis County, Texas, United States, that also serves the city Palmer, Texas, being located approximately  north of the central business district. The airport has no IATA or ICAO designation.

The airport is used solely for general aviation purposes.

Facilities 
Dallas South Port Airport has one runway:
 Runway 17/35: 3,800 x 100 ft. (1,158 x 30 m), Surface: Turf

For the 12-month period ending December 31, 2015, the airport had 1,800 aircraft operations, an average of 5 per day: 100% general aviation. At that time there were 12 aircraft based at this airport: 100% single-engine, with no multi-engine, jets, helicopters, nor gliders.

References

External links 
  at Texas DOT Airport Directory

Airports in Texas
Airports in the Dallas–Fort Worth metroplex
Transportation in Ellis County, Texas